The REWERSE Rule Markup Language (R2ML) is developed by the REWERSE Working Group I1 for the purpose of rules interchange between different systems and tools.

Scope

 An XML based rule language;
 Support for: integrity rules, derivation rules, production rules and reaction rules;
 Integrate functional languages (such as OCL) with Datalog languages (such as SWRL);
 Serialization and interchange of rules by specific software tools;
 Integrating rule reasoning with actual server side technologies;
 Deploying, publishing and communicating rules in a network.

Design principles

 Modeled using MDA;
 Rule concepts defined with the help of MOF/UML;
 Required to accommodate:
 Web naming concepts, such as URIs and XML namespaces;
 The ontological distinction between objects and data values;
 The datatype concepts of RDF and user-defined datatypes;
 Actions (following OMG PRR submission);
 Events;
 EBNF abstract syntax;
 XML based concrete syntax validated by an XML Schema;
 Allowing different semantics for rules.

See also
 Ontology (computer science)
 Business rules
 Business rules approach
 RuleML
 Semantic Web Rule Language

External links 
 REWERSE
 Rule Interchange Format WG
 RuleML

Rule engines
XML markup languages
Knowledge representation languages